Andrei Sergeyevich Bubnov (3 April [O.S. 22 March] 1883 – 1 August 1938) was a Russian Bolshevik revolutionary leader, one of Bolshevik leaders in Ukraine, Soviet politician and military leader and member of the Left Opposition.

Life

Early career 

Bubnov was born in Ivanovo-Voznesensk in Vladimir Governorate (now Ivanovo, Ivanovo Oblast, Russia) on 23 March 1883 into a local Russian merchant's family. He was expelled from Moscow University for revolutionary activities. He studied at the Moscow Agricultural Institute and while a student joined the Russian Social Democratic Labour Party (RSDLP) in 1903. He was a supporter of the Bolshevik faction of the party. In summer 1905, he joined the Ivanono-Voznesensk party committee, and was their delegate to the 4th (1906) and 5th (1907) Party Conferences in Stockholm and London. In 1907–08, he was a member of the RSDLP's Moscow committee, and of the Bolshevik committee for the Central Industrial Region. He was arrested in 1908. 
On his release from prison in 1909 Bubnov was made an agent of the Central Committee in Moscow. He was arrested again in 1910, and interned in a fortress. After his release in 1911, he was sent to organize workers in Nizhny Novgorod. From there, he was one of the organisers of the Prague Conference of January 1912, the first that excluded all RSDLP members who were not Bolsheviks. He was under arrest at the time of the conference, but in his absence was elected a candidate member of the first all-Bolshevik Central Committee. Afterwards he was sent to St Petersburg to assist in the launch of Pravda, and to work with the Bolshevik faction in the Fourth Duma. Arrested yet again, he was deported to Kharkov.

In the Russian Revolution and Civil War
On the outbreak of the First World War Bubnov became involved in the anti-war movement. He was but was soon arrested and deported to Poltava. He moved To Samara, where he was arrested in October 1916 - for the thirteenth time, in total - and exiled to Siberia. Bubnov returned to Moscow in 1917 after the February Revolution. He joined the Moscow Soviet and, at the 6th Party Conference in July 1917, he was elected to its central committee. In August, he moved to Petrograd. Just before the October Revolution, he was elected as one of the seven members of the first Bolshevik Politburo alongside Lenin,  Zinoviev, Kamenev, Trotsky, Stalin, and Sokolnikov. As a member of the Military Revolutionary Committee he helped organize the October Revolution, but in February 1918, he was of the leading members of the Left Communist faction (Left communism), who opposed Lenin's decision to sign the Treaty of Brest-Litovsk, to end the war with Germany. During the Russian Civil War Bubnov joined the Red Army and fought on the Ukrainian Front. In 1921–22, he was posted in the North Caucasus.

In the Soviet Union 
After the war he joined the Moscow Party Committee and became a member of the Left Opposition.

He was not always orthodox: The Party noted that he was with the "left-wing" in 1918, the "Democratic Centralists" in 1920–1, and the Trotskyites in 1923, when he signed their Declaration of 46. In January 1924, however, he switched to supporting Joseph Stalin and was rewarded by being appointed as Head of Political Control of the Red Army. From the 13th (1924) to 17th (1934) Party Conferences, he was elected to the central committee.

Following the Canton Coup on 20 March 1926, he worked out an agreement with the new Nationalist leader Chiang Kai-shek. He then worked with Grigori Voitinsky and Fedor Raskolnikov on the "Preliminary Theses on the Situation in China", which was presented to the ECCI in November and December of that year.

In 1929, he replaced Lunacharsky as People's Commissar for Education. As Commissar for Education, he ended the period of progressive, experimental educational practices and switched the emphasis to training in practical industrial skills. It was in this capacity that he attended the First All-Russian Museum Congress held in Moscow in December 1930.

Arrest and death 
Bubnov was arrested, for the last time, by the NKVD during the Great Purge on 17 October 1937, and expelled from the Party Central Committee in November 1937. Records from the time, which were not made public until the 1980s and 1990s, show that he was sentenced to death on 1 August 1938 and shot the same day. The modus operandi of the Soviet regime was often to keep secret the fate of particular purged persons: whether they were sent to internal exile to a labor camp, sent to a psychiatric hospital (in which the regime disguised confinement and drugging as compassionate "health care"), or executed. This policy encouraged their families and the general public to believe that they were probably still alive in a camp or hospital somewhere. Bubnov was posthumously rehabilitated in February 1956 during the de-Stalinization of the Khrushchev thaw. The Soviet government did not make public the lists of the purged persons who had already long been executed. Thus, their relatives were often still searching for them in various psychiatric hospitals in the 1970s, as was the case with Bubnov.

Notes

References

1883 births
1938 deaths
People from Ivanovo
People from Shuysky Uyezd
Russian Social Democratic Labour Party members
Old Bolsheviks
Politburo of the Central Committee of the Communist Party of the Soviet Union members
Members of the Orgburo of the Central Committee of the Communist Party of the Soviet Union
Head of Propaganda Department of CPSU CC
Politburo of the Central Committee of the Communist Party of Ukraine (Soviet Union) members
Group of Democratic Centralism
Left Opposition
People's commissars and ministers of the Russian Soviet Federative Socialist Republic
Soviet propagandists
Russian exiles in the Russian Empire
People of the Russian Civil War
Great Purge victims from Russia
Russian people executed by the Soviet Union
Russian anti-capitalists
Soviet rehabilitations